Opole Zachodnie railway station is a station on the western bank of the River Oder in  Opole, Opole Voivodeship, Poland. An extensive amount of the station is located on a viaduct by Wojska Polskiego Street. In 2003, the station underwent major renovation works, together with the modernisation of the Wrocław-Opole railway line. The station has high passenger flow for passengers heading to and from Nysa and Wrocław.

Connections 

132 Bytom - Wrocław Główny
287 Opole Zachodnie - Nysa

Train services
The station is served by the following service(s):

Regional services (PR) Wrocław Główny - Oława - Brzeg - Opole Główne
Regional service (PR) Wrocław - Oława - Brzeg - Opole Główne - Kędzierzyn-Koźle
Regional service (PR) Wrocław - Oława - Brzeg - Opole Główne - Kędzierzyn-Koźle - Racibórz
Regional service (PR) Wrocław - Oława - Brzeg - Opole Główne - Gliwice
Regional service (PR) Brzeg - Opole
Regional service (PR) Brzeg - Opole - Kędzierzyn-Koźle
Regional services (PR) Opole - Nysa
Regional services (PR) Kluczbork - Opole - Nysa

References 

Zachodnie
Railway stations in Opole Voivodeship
Railway stations in Poland opened in 1843